Chrysanthemum species are used as food plants by the larvae of a number of Lepidoptera species including:

 Bucculatricidae
 Several Bucculatrix leaf-miner species:
 B. chrysanthemella
 B. leucanthemella
 Geometridae
 Orthonama obstipata (gem) – leaves
 Hepialidae
 Hepialus humuli (ghost moth)
 Korscheltellus lupulina (common swift)
 Noctuidae
 Agrotis segetum (turnip moth)
 Mamestra brassicae (cabbage moth)
 Naenia typica (gothic)
 Noctua pronuba (large yellow underwing)
 Phlogophora meticulosa (angle shades)
 Xestia c-nigrum (setaceous Hebrew character)

External links

Chrysanthemum
+Lepidoptera